Eriogonum brachyanthum is a species of wild buckwheat that is commonly known as shortflower buckwheat. It is native to eastern California and western Nevada, particularly the Mojave Desert region, where it is common to abundant, and even sometimes weedy. It is also known from southern Oregon. The plant grows in sandy habitats such as desert flats and sagebrush. It also grows in pinyon-juniper and montane conifer woodlands. It is an annual herb that grows 30 to 40 centimeters tall. Leaves are located at the base of the stem, woolly, and oval or rounded in shape. The top of the stem is occupied by a branching inflorescence bearing many widely spaced clusters of flowers. Each individual flower is about a millimeter wide and light yellow in color. Flowers bloom from April to November.

References

External links
Jepson Manual Treatment
Photo gallery

brachyanthum
Flora of California
Flora of Nevada
Flora of Oregon
Flora without expected TNC conservation status